The 2002 Malta International Tournament (known as the Rothmans Tournament for sponsorship reasons) was the eleventh edition of the Malta International Tournament. Held between 9 February and 13 February 2002, the tournament was contested by host country Malta, Jordan, Lithuania and Moldova.

Matches

Winner

Statistics

Goalscorers

See also 
China Cup
Cyprus International Football Tournament

References 

2001–02 in Maltese football
2001–02 in Moldovan football
2002 in Lithuanian football
2001–02 in Jordanian football
2002